The Chillingworth Stakes is a Grade III American Thoroughbred horse race for fillies and mares that are three years old or older, over a distance of  furlongs on the dirt track held annually in October at Santa Anita Park, Arcadia, California.  The event currently carries a purse of $100,000.

History 
The race was inaugurated in 1986 as the Midwick Handicap and was over a distance of 1 mile on the turf and was held as part of the 1986 Breeders' Cup program at Santa Anita Park. The race was named after The Midwick Tract neighborhood was originally part of Midwick Country Club located today in Alhambra in Los Angeles County which is not far from Arcadia where the racetrack is located.

In 1989 the event was renamed to the Louis R. Rowan Handicap in honor of Louis R. Rowan who co-founded the Oak Tree Racing Association, which had held their fall meeting at Santa Anita Park as well as co-founder of the California Thoroughbred Foundation.

By the early 2000s the event became sporadically held. In 2000 the event was run over the Downhill turf course over the shorter distance of about  furlongs and with conditions for Californian bred entries. After an absence of two years the event was resumed earlier in the racing year on the dirt track over a distance of six furlongs as the Pine Tree Lane Stakes. In 2009 the event was reverted to the Louis R. Rowan Stakes with the 2010 running moved to Hollywood Park racetrack and held on the All Weather track.

With the end of Oak Tree holding their fall meeting in 2011 at Santa Anita Park, the administration of the track renamed the event to the current name L.A. Woman Stakes. In 2012 the event was renamed after the song L.A. Woman by the American rock band the Doors and written by Jim Morrison. The song later in 2014 was regarded by LA Weekly named it  on their list of  "the 20 best songs about the city of Los Angeles".

In 2014 the event was upgraded to a Grade III event.

In 2020 the event was renamed to the Chillingworth Stakes in honor of Sherwood Chillingworth, the longtime director and executive vice president of the Oak Tree Racing Association.

Records
Speed record: 
  furlongs on the dirt – 1:14.84 – Top Kisser  (2014)
  furlongs on the AWT – 1:14.07  – Theverythoughtof U (2007)
 1 mile on the turf – 1:33.19 –  	Reluctant Guest  (1991)
 
Margins: 
  lengths – Mother Ruth (2010)
 
Most wins
 2 – Aberushka (1986, 1987)
 2 - Ce Ce (2021, 2022)

Most wins by a jockey  
 3 – Mike E. Smith  (2009, 2013, 2017)
 3 – Gary L. Stevens (1987, 1990, 1994)

Most wins by a trainer
 3 – Bob Baffert  (2003, 2005, 2010)

Most wins by an owner
 2 – Jerome & Ann Moss (1986, 1987)
 2 - Bo Hirsch (2021, 2022)

Winners 

Legend:

See also
List of American and Canadian Graded races

Notes

References

Graded stakes races in the United States
Grade 3 stakes races in the United States
Recurring sporting events established in 1986
1986 establishments in California
Horse races in California
Sprint category horse races for fillies and mares
Santa Anita Park